King Tide is a Sydney based Reggae band fronted by Tony Hughes. Originally formed for a residency at Bondi's Beach Road Hotel they have since toured around Australia.

Members
Tony Hughes
Paul "Snatch" Snashel
Peter Firth
Robbie Woolf
Lindsay Page
Ross Fotheringham
Declan Kelly
Terepai Richmond
Geoff Innes
Nathan Shepherd
Roy Ferrin
Alex Hewitson
Tony Gilbert
Ras Country Man
Alex Page De Mars
Sean Collins

Discography
To Our Dearly Deported (2005) - Vitamin Records
Scared New World (2006) - Vitamin Records
Roots Pop Reggae (2009) - Vitamin Records
Summertime Vibration Pack (2011)

References

External links
http://www.kingtidemusic.com/ King Tide]

Australian reggae musical groups
Musical groups from Sydney